Burcu Biricik Yetkin (born 4 May 1989) is a Turkish actress.

Early life
Biricik was born on 4 May 1988 in Elmalı, Antalya Province. She is of Yörük descent, which is a Turkic ethnic subgroup. In 2006, at the beauty competition Miss Mediterranean in Antalya she was chosen as Akdeniz's beauty. After participating at a theater festival and winning an award, she decided to become an actress, and after receiving a bachelor's degree in archeology from Ege University, she received acting training at the Bornova Municipal City Theater. Biricik began her acting career by taking part in the internship at Bornova Municipal City Theater. There she took part in plays such as İkinin Biri, Yaşlı Hanımın Ziyareti, Gözlerimi Kaparım, Vazifemi Yaparım and Yedi Kocalı Hürmüz.She had her first uncredited tv roles in series "Maçolar"(2006), "Ümit Milli"(2006). 

She guest roles in historical series "Muhteşem Yüzyıl"(2011) and period series "Ustura Kemal"(2011) based from comic book.

Her first leading role is in romantic comedy series Düşman Kardeşler with Kaan Urgancıoğlu. Her fame gained with Seda character in popular youth series Beni Böyle Sev. With a remarkable sense of psychology and humour, she forcefully performed a wide range of characters in various genres, including many popular dramas and comedies. She received critical acclaim and won numerous accolades, including Mannheim Turkish Film Festival Best Actress Award and nominated Seoul Best Actress Awards .

Filmography

References

1989 births
Living people
Turkish television actresses
Turkish film actresses
Ege University alumni
People from Antalya Province